Noteworthy may refer to:

Noteworthy (vocal group)
Notability
 NoteWorthy Composer (NWC), a scorewriter application
Wikipedia:Notability